Enteromius potamogalis is a species of ray-finned fish in the genus Enteromius from the Rio Muni in Equatorial Guinea.

References 

 

Enteromius
Fish described in 1867